Hubert Aiwanger (born 26 January 1971) is a German politician and party leader of the Free Voters (German: Freie Wähler) since 2018 and is currently the Deputy Minister President of Bavaria and the Bavarian Minister of Economic affairs, Regional Development and Energy. He is both the faction leader of the Federal Association of Free Voters as well as the Bavarian State Association of Free and Independent Voters, in addition to being the chairman of the Federal Free Voters Party and the Free Voters of Bavaria Party. He has acted as the Party leader of the Parliamentary faction of the Free Voters of Bavaria since 2008.

Early life 
Upon graduating from the Burkhart-Gymnasium in Mallersdorf-Pfaffenberg and subsequently finishing his compulsory military service, he studied agricultural sciences at the Weihenstephan College with tuition assistance from the Hanns-Seidel-Stiftung, receiving a degree in Agricultural Engineering. Aiwanger is a Roman Catholic.

Political career 
Aiwanger joined the Free Voters shortly before the council elections of 2002. He ran as a candidate for the city council of Rottenburg an der Laaber, but narrowly lost the race. He then shortly thereafter rose through the party ranks, joining the regional council of Rottenburg. In 2004 he became a member of the county council in Landshut and had a brief tenure as the district chairman

In a surprising series of events he was narrowly elected State Chairman of the Free Voters of Bavaria in a party meeting on 25 March 2006, held in Garching bei München, winning 340 votes against 322, after the previous chairman declined to run. In October 2014 he was reelected with 92% of the vote.

At the executive elections of the Federal Association in Berlin on March 27, 2010 Aiwanger was elected federal chairman of the Free Voters. On February 20, 2010, Hubert Aiwanger was elected to the office of the new Federal Chairman of the Federal Association of Free Voters in Münster when on October 19, 2013, he was confirmed with 88 percent of the vote. The newly founded federal association replaced the previously existing federal voter group, which was required to participate in the European elections.

His greatest success came as a result of the 2008 elections, wherein he and the Free Voters won 10.8% of the vote, putting them past the threshold required by the Bavarian Parliament.

On October 13, 2012, he was symbolically nominated as the leading candidate of the Free Voters in Bavaria for the local state election. He ran for the constituency Landshut, earning almost 58,000 votes and in September 2013 was reelected for the second time in the state parliament. In the state election on 14 October 2018 he received in the constituency Landshut 25.0% of the first votes; with 102,691 total votes he was re-elected on the list of the constituency of Lower Bavaria.

Hubert Aiwanger has been a member of the City Council in Rottenburg an der Laaber since March 2008 and is a district council member in Landshut.

Aiwanger failed to reach his goal of leading the Free Voters to the European Parliament in 2009. However, following the successful lawsuits against the percentage hurdle, in May 2014 the Free Voters for the first time sent an MEP to the EU Parliament, Ulrike Müller.

After the 2018 state elections, he and the Free Voters joined a coalition Government with the leading CSU (Christian Social Union, German: Christlich-Soziale Union), which placed them in the governing Party for the first time. Aiwanger subsequently became the Deputy Prime Minister of Bavaria and became the Bavarian Minister of Economic Affairs, Regional Development and Energy.

Criticisms and controversies

Criticism of leadership style 
Aiwanger has been accused of lack of leadership by members of the Federal Executive, especially regarding alleged poor housekeeping of some national associations. This led to the resignation of the Federal Managing Director Cordula Breitenfellner and Judge Bernd Richter. After the designated candidate for the federal election, Stephan Werhahn, allegedly critisied Aiwanger, saying, among other things, "dictatorial leadership conditions as in Cuba", the board of Saarland demanded his resignation as federal chairman.

The run-up to the Federal election in 2013 was met with criticism from within the Free Voters Party.

Controversies 
In January and February of 2012, Aiwanger was criticised for tweeting several jokes and as a result of criticism from within his Party, he deleted his Twitter account on February 9, 2012.

Since February 2016 Aiwanger has reopened his Twitter account.

Positions

Migration and immigration policy 
Aiwanger has said in the context of the refugee crisis that Germany must be "satisfied and happy" that Austria would no longer beckon refugees. He also commented positively on the fact that the Balkan route was closed, but at the same time warned against new waves of refugees. Aiwanger said that politically persecuted people must receive asylum, but he sees them as "temporary guests". Aiwanger complains that the immigration policy of recent years has been poorly controlled. He subsequently advocates immigration according to the Canadian merit-based model.

EU bailouts 
Aiwanger has positioned the Free Voters as a protest party against the Euro Bailout policy. Their demonstrations for this cause have been criticized by the likes of the Green Party.

Political successes

Achievements

Successful referendum campaign designed to reintroduce the G9 Gymnasium system 
Aiwanger and the Free Voters successfully organized a referendum on the issue of the Gymnasium length in 2014 with the intent of reintroducing the 9 year Gymnasium in Bavaria as opposed to the 8 year Gymnasium that most states in Germany had started switching to since the early 2000s. The Free Voters succeeded in reinstituting the G9, despite opposition from the CSU, who wanted to introduce a “flexibilization year” for Gymnasium students, i.e. an optional 9th year, as well as the Greens, who simply want to improve the G8 system.

Abolition of tuition fees in higher education 
From the 17th until the 30th of July 2013, the Aiwanger and the Free Voters successfully campaigned for a referendum to abolish college tuition in Bavaria. The referendum “No to school tuitions in Bavaria” (German: Nein zu Studiengebühren in Bayern) earned 14.3% of the 2013 vote. After the Bavarian Parliament approved the proposal it was implemented during the 2013/2014 school year.

Abolition of road improvements contribution taxes 
Under Aiwanger's leadership, the Free Voters have also successfully abolished taxes regarding road improvement contributions (German: Straßenausbaubeiträge, shortened to Strab). This tax was paid for by homeowners on the street in which road improvement was occurring in order to finance the road maintenance. After the 1st of January, 2018, this tax was no longer levied due to the Free Voter's efforts.

External links 

 Biography
 Website

References

1971 births
Living people
21st-century German politicians
Ministers of the Bavaria State Government
Members of the Landtag of Bavaria